Hugo Rolando Brizuela Benítez (born 8 February 1969) is a former Paraguayan football striker. He was part of the C.F. Pachuca team that won the Invierno 2001 championship in Mexico.

Brizuela represented Paraguay at the 1998 FIFA World Cup. He earned a total of 15 caps with three goals scored between 1998 and 2002.

External links

Career history at Weltfussball.de

1969 births
Living people
Paraguayan footballers
Paraguayan expatriate footballers
Paraguay international footballers
Expatriate footballers in Argentina
Argentinos Juniors footballers
Chacarita Juniors footballers
C.F. Pachuca players
Club León footballers
Expatriate footballers in Mexico
Barcelona S.C. footballers
Expatriate footballers in Ecuador
Club Deportivo Universidad Católica footballers
O'Higgins F.C. footballers
Audax Italiano footballers
Argentine Primera División players
Chilean Primera División players
Primera B de Chile players
Liga MX players
Expatriate footballers in Chile
1998 FIFA World Cup players
1997 Copa América players
Association football forwards